The 1917 The Citadel Bulldogs football team represented The Citadel, The Military College of South Carolina in the 1917 college football season. Harry J. O'Brien served as coach for the second season. The Bulldogs played as members of the Southern Intercollegiate Athletic Association and played home games at College Park Stadium in Hampton Park.

Schedule

References

Citadel
The Citadel Bulldogs football seasons
Citadel Bulldogs football